The Miss British Virgin Islands is a national beauty pageant in British Virgin Islands. The pageant was founded in 1976, where the winners were sent to Miss Universe.

History
The Miss British Virgin Islands was held for the first time in 1975 by BVI Tourism, and Irene Penn-O’Neal won the first titleholder in that year. Before the pageant formed into the British Virgin Islands, the BVI Miss Festival contest existed in the territory. Since 1976 the British Virgin Islands licensed the Miss Universe pageant and became an official organization in the territory for Miss Universe under the Ministry of Tourism in the British Virgin Islands.

International crowns

 One – Miss Caribbean World winner: 
Sharie De Castro (2013)

Titleholders

1975-2020
 Winning International Title 
 Miss Universe British Virgin Islands
 Miss World British Virgin Islands

{| class="wikitable sortable" style="font-size: 95%; text-align:center"
!width="60"|Year||width="250"|Miss British Virgin Islands
|-
| 1975
| Irene Penn-O’Neal
|-
| 1976
| style="background:#FADADD;"|Andria Dolores Norman
|-
| 1979
| style="background:#FADADD;"|Eartha Ferdinand
|-
| 1980
| style="background:#FADADD;"|Barbara Enola Stevens 
|-
| 1981
| style="background:#FADADD;"|Carmen Nibbs
|-
| 1982
| style="background:#FADADD;"|Luce Dahlia Hodge
|-
| 1983
| style="background:#FADADD;"|Anna Maria Joseph
|-
| 1984
| style="background:#FADADD;"|Donna Patricia Frett 
|-
| 1985
| style="background:#FADADD;"|Jennifer Leonora Penn
|-
| 1986
| style="background:#FADADD;"|Shereen Desmona Flax 
|-
| 1987
| style="background:#FADADD;"|Sandy Michelle Harrigan 
|-
| 1988
| style="background:#FADADD;"|Nelda Felecia Farrington 
|-
| 1989
| style="background:#FADADD;"|Viola Marguerite Joseph 
|-
| 1990
| style="background:#FADADD;"|Jestina Hodge
|-
| 1991
| style="background:#FADADD;"|Anne Lennard
|-
| 1992
| style="background:#FADADD;"|Alicia Burke 
|-
| 1993
| style="background:#FADADD;"|Rhonda Hodge 
|-
| 1994
| style="background:#FADADD;"|Delia Jon Baptiste 
|-
| 1995
| style="background:#FADADD;"|Elaine Patricia Henry
|-
| 1996
| style="background:#FADADD;"|Linette Smith
|-
| 1997
| style="background:#FADADD;"|Melinda Penn 
|-
| 1998
| style="background:#FADADD;"|Kaida Donovan 
|-
| 1999
| Kamila Smith
|-
| 2000
| style="background:#FADADD;"|Tausha Vanterpool
|-
| 2001
| Shakima Stoutt
|-
| 2002
| style="background:#FADADD;"|Anastasia Tongue
|-
| 2003
| Dian Sanderson
|-
| 2004
| Sharlita Millington
|-
| 2005
| Kirsten Lettsome
|-
| 2006
| Shermel Maduro 
|-
| 2007
| Leilani Stevens 
|-
| 2008
| style="background:#FADADD;"|Maquita RichardsDid not compete|-
| 2009
| style="background:#FADADD;"|Josefina Nunez 
|-
| 2010
| style="background:#FADADD;"|Sheroma Hodge 
|-
| 2011
| style="background:#FADADD;"|Abigail Hyndman
|-
|-style="background-color:gold; font-weight: bold"
| 2012
| Sharie De CastroMiss Caribbean World 2013
|-
| 2013
| style="background:#CCFF99;"|Rosanna Chichester 
|-
| 2014
| style="background:#FADADD;"|Jaynene Jno Lewis
|-
| 2015
| style="background:#FADADD;"|Adorya Racio Baly 
|-
| 2016
| style="background:#FADADD;"|Erika Creque
|-
| 2017
| style="background:#FADADD;"|Khephra Sylvester
|-
| 2018
| style="background:#FADADD;"|A’yana Keshelle Phillips
|-
| 2019
| style="background:#FADADD;"|Bria Ashley Smith
|-
| 2020
| style="background:#FADADD;"|Shabree Frett
|-
|}

2021-presentBegan 2021 there are 3 main titles in the British Virgin Islands. The International representations will wear Miss Universe British Virgin Islands and Miss World British Virgin Islands, and the Miss British Virgin Islands title will be national ambassador of local tourism in the territory.Representatives to international beauty pageants
Miss Universe British Virgin IslandsThe winner of Miss British Virgin Islands represents her country at the Miss Universe. On occasion, when the winner does not qualify (due to age) for either contest, a runner-up is sent.Miss World British Virgin IslandsThe 1st Runner-up of Miss British Virgin Islands crowned Miss British Virgin Islands World until 2017. Began 2018 an independent selection, Miss World BVI crowned the winner to Miss World pageant.''

Miss Earth British Virgin Islands

References

External links 
bvitourism.com
MissBritishVirginIslands

Beauty pageants in the British Virgin Islands
British Virgin Islands
Recurring events established in 1976
1976 establishments in the British Virgin Islands
British Virgin Islands awards
Government-owned beauty pageants